Arthur Bernard Miles (19 February 1888 – 7 August 1960) was an Australian rules footballer who played for the St Kilda Football Club in the Victorian Football League (VFL).

Notes

External links 

1888 births
1960 deaths
Australian rules footballers from Melbourne
St Kilda Football Club players
People from Carlton, Victoria